Dongsan is a mountain of Chungcheongbuk-do, South Korea. It has an altitude of 896 metres.

See also
List of mountains of Korea

References

Mountains of North Chungcheong Province
Jecheon
Danyang County
Mountains of South Korea